Perryville is an unincorporated town in Decatur County, Tennessee and one of the oldest towns in Decatur County. It is located on the Tennessee River, five miles east of Parsons. Founded in 1821, at one time it was the county seat of Perry County, Tennessee.

There is a marina in Perryville.

References

Unincorporated communities in Tennessee
Unincorporated communities in Decatur County, Tennessee
Tennessee populated places on the Tennessee River
Former county seats in Tennessee